Elaeocyma is a genus of sea snails in the family Drilliidae.

Description
This genus contains the light-colored species, with an oily gloss, thin shells, and prominent riblets usually crossed by rather widely spaced spiral striations, previously included in the genus Drillia.

Distribution
This marine genus occurs off the Pacific coast of America.

Species
Species within the genus Elaeocyma include:
 Elaeocyma amplinucis McLean & Poorman, 1971
 Elaeocyma arenensis (Hertlein & Strong, 1951)
 Elaeocyma attalia Dall, 1919
 † Elaeocyma benten (Yokoyama, 1920)
 † Elaeocyma citharella (Lamarck, 1803)
 † Elaeocyma drilliaeformis (Cossmann & Pissarro, 1901)
 Elaeocyma empyrosia (Dall, 1899)
 Elaeocyma melichroa McLean & Poorman, 1971
 † Elaeocyma plicata Lamarck 1804
 Elaeocyma ricaudae Berry, 1969
 Elaeocyma splendidula (Sowerby I, 1834)
 † Elaeocyma subcostaria (de Boury, 1899)
 Elaeocyma tjibaliungensis Y. Otuka, 1937
 Elaeocyma tjibaliungensis turuhikoi Y. Otuka, 1937 (synonym: Clavus (Elaeocyma) tjibaliungensis turuhikoi Otuka, 1937)
Species brought into synonymy
 Elaeocyma abdera Dall, 1919 : synonym of Crassispira abdera (Dall, 1919)
 Elaeocyma acapulcana Lowe, 1935 : synonym of Drillia acapulcana (Lowe, 1935)
 Elaeocyma aegina Dall, 1919 : synonym of Calliclava aegina (Dall, 1919)
 Elaeocyma aerope Dall, 1919 : synonym of Drillia aerope (Dall, 1919)
 Elaeocyma arbela Dall, 1919 : synonym of Cymatosyrinx arbela (Dall, 1919)
 Elaeocyma baileyi Berry, 1969: synonym of Splendrillia lalage (Dall, 1919)
† Elaeocyma chinensis MacNeil, 1960 : synonym of Siphonofusus chinensis (MacNeil, 1960)
 Elaeocyma craneana Hertlein & Strong, 1951 : synonym of Calliclava craneana (Hertlein & Strong, 1951)
 Elaeocyma halocydne Dall, 1919 : synonym of Kylix halocydne (Dall, 1919)
 Elaeocyma ianthe Dall, 1919 : synonym of Kylix ianthe (Dall, 1919)
 Elaeocyma impressa Hinds, 1843: synonym of Kylix impressa (R.B. Hinds, 1843)
 Elaeocyma salvadorica Hertlein & Strong, 1951: synonym of Clathrodrillia salvadorica (Hertlein & Strong, 1951)

The Indo-Pacific Molluscan Database (OBIS) also accepts the following subspecies:
 Elaeocyma glabriuscula glabriuscula (Yokoyama, 1922)
 Elaeocyma glabriuscula brevis (Yokoyama, 1922)

The following species are also included in this genus by the Shell Catalogue:
 Elaeocyma clavata (Sowerby, G.B. I, 1834)

References

External links
 Worldwide Mollusca Database: Family Drilliidae
  Patrick De Wever & Annie Cornée, Le contenu paléontologique du Lutétien du bassin de Paris; Muséum national d’Histoire naturelle, Paris (2008)